Tony McNamara may refer to:

 Tony McNamara (footballer) (1929–2015), English footballer
 Tony McNamara (writer) (born 1967), Australian writer for film and television